Hebrew Academy of Long Beach (HALB) is a Modern Orthodox Jewish day school located on the South Shore of Long Island in New York. Its founding principal was Rabbi Armin H. Friedman in 1954. The name refers back to the presence in Long Beach which ended after its West Broadway location was closed in 2017.

It contains five schools: 
 Lev Chana Preschool (preschool and kindergarten) in Hewlett Bay Park
 HALB Elementary School (Grades 1–8) previously in Long Beach and now in Woodmere
 SKA- Stella K. Abraham High School for Girls in Hewlett Bay Park
 DRS- Davis Renov Stahler Yeshiva High School for Boys in Woodmere
 Yeshivat Lev Shlomo- for post-high school students who wish to continue their Jewish education. Located in the DRS building.

The HALB Elementary School and DRS buildings also serve as a Jewish day camp in the summer called Avnet. Avnet runs on Monday through Friday.

HALB Elementary School moved into the building where School Number Six was previously located during March of the 2016–17 school year.

History 
The Hebrew Academy of Long Beach was founded in 1954, its founding principal was Rabbi Armin H. Friedman. The HALB began implementing a blended learning model in its classrooms based on Bloom's taxonomy, as well as social and emotional learning (SEL) training for teachers. As of March 2022, HALB enrolled 1,700 students in its schools.

References

External links
Hebrew Academy of Long Beach (HALB)
National Center for Education Statistics data for HALB Elementary School

Modern Orthodox Jewish day schools in the United States
Long Beach, New York
Schools in Nassau County, New York
Jewish day schools in New York (state)
Private high schools in New York (state)
Private middle schools in New York (state)
Private elementary schools in New York (state)